André Luiz Silva do Nascimento (born 27 January 1980), or simply André Luiz, is a Brazilian former professional footballer who played as a defender.

Career
André Luiz was born in São João del Rei, Minas Gerais State. He played for Tupi Minas before transferred to Clube Atlético Mineiro in 2003.

He signed by AS Nancy in summer 2005. He won 2006 Coupe de la Ligue.

Honours
Palmeiras
Campeonato Brasileiro Série B: 2013

External links
 
 
 

1980 births
Living people
Sportspeople from Minas Gerais
Brazilian footballers
Brazilian expatriate footballers
Expatriate footballers in France
Association football defenders
Cruzeiro Esporte Clube players
Ipatinga Futebol Clube players
Clube Atlético Mineiro players
AS Nancy Lorraine players
Sociedade Esportiva Palmeiras players
Campeonato Brasileiro Série A players
Campeonato Brasileiro Série B players
Ligue 1 players